Jekuthiel Ginsburg (1889–1957) was a professor of mathematics at Yeshiva University. He established the journal Scripta Mathematica. He also was honored as a fellow of the New York Academy of Sciences.

References
.
.

1889 births
1957 deaths
20th-century American mathematicians
American Jews